Coppermine may refer, apart from the primary meaning of copper extraction, to:
 Coppermine Bay, Greenland
 Coppermine Herald, one of the heralds at the Canadian Heraldic Authority
 Coppermine Peninsula, Antarctica
 Coppermine Photo Gallery
 Coppermine River, in Nunavut and the Northwest Territories
 Kugluktuk, Nunavut, formerly known as Coppermine
 Pentium III, a microprocessor code-named "Coppermine"